The 1980 Uganda National League was the 13th season of the Ugandan football championship, the top-level football league of Uganda.

Overview
The 1980 Uganda National League was contested by 16 teams and was won by Nile Breweries from Jinja, while COOPS, Mbarara and Bell FC were relegated.

League standings

Leading goalscorer
The top goalscorer in the 1980 season was Davis Kamoga of Kampala City Council FC with 21 goals.

References

External links
 Uganda - List of Champions - RSSSF (Hans Schöggl)
 Ugandan Football League Tables - League321.com

Ugandan Super League seasons
Uganda
Uganda
1